Coleochaetophyceae are a class of charophyte algae that includes some of the closest multicellular relatives of land plants. Their mitogenome is the most intron rich organelle among the streptophyte algae.

References

Charophyta
Green algae classes